The Edinburgh Painter was an Attic black-figure vase painter, active around 500 BC. His speciality was white-ground lekythoi painted in the black-figure style. 

His real name is unknown. His conventional name is derived from his name vase in Edinburgh, National Museum of Scotland 1956.436.

Gallery

Bibliography
 C. H. Emilie Haspels: Attic black-figured lekythoi, Paris 1936, p. 86-89. 215-221.
 John Beazley: Attic Black-Figure Vase-Painters, Oxford 1956, p. 476-480.
 John Boardman: Schwarzfigurige Vasen aus Athen. Ein Handbuch, Mainz 1977, p. 159.
 Thomas Mannack: Haspels addenda: additional references to C. H. E. Haspels Attic black-figured Lekythoi. Oxford 2006. , p.

External links

Vases by the Edinburgh Painter in Perseus

Ancient Greek vase painters